Nicholas James Selman (born 18 October 1995) is an Australian-English cricketer. Born in Brisbane, he earned youth representative honours for Queensland at both cricket and Australian rules football before choosing to make cricket his primary sport. In an attempt to start his professional career, he moved to England for the 2014 cricket season and played club cricket for Tunbridge Wells CC. Meanwhile, he was spotted by Kent and made four second eleven appearances for them in the second half of the season. He made five further appearances for the Kent 2nds in the first half of 2015, before a pair of trial matches for the Gloucestershire and Glamorgan 2nd teams. Having made half-centuries in each innings of his trial game with Glamorgan, he made a permanent move to the Welsh county in November 2015 and made his first-class debut in a 2016 County Championship match at home to Worcestershire on 8 May 2016.

Selman holds dual passport.

References

External links
 

1995 births
Living people
Australian cricketers
English cricketers
Glamorgan cricketers
Cricketers from Brisbane
Australian emigrants to the United Kingdom
English cricketers of the 21st century